Fåglavik is a bimunicipal village situated in Herrljunga Municipality and Vara Municipality in Västra Götaland County, Sweden. It had 209 inhabitants in 2005, increasing to 5043 in 2010.

Fåglavik is the birthplace of the Blessed Mary Elisabeth Hesselblad (June 4, 1870 – April 24, 1957): nurse, Catholic nun and re-founder of the Bridgettines. Artist Jan van den Bergen used to live in the house where she was born. Van den Bergen, who was known for painting fantasy scenes, died some time after 2008 due to cancer.

The village used to have a glass factory; a brick building which was contaminated with asbestos. During 2008, the building was demolished and site conditioned to reduce the spread of contamination into the environment.

References 

Populated places in Västra Götaland County
Populated places in Herrljunga Municipality
Populated places in Vara Municipality